Zoniana is a town and a former municipality in the Rethymno regional unit, Crete, Greece. Since the 2011 local government reform it is part of the municipality Mylopotamos, of which it is a municipal unit. Population 1,117 (2011).

References

Populated places in Rethymno (regional unit)